Cune Press is a Seattle-based US publisher. It was established in 1994 by American entrepreneur Scott C. Davis. Cune features a variety of Middle East-related books, with a focus on Syria and the Levant. Cune also publishes literary nonfiction with an interest in women of courage and West coast authors. To support its literary publishing efforts, Cune also publishes books on education and is developing how-to titles on various subjects.

History
Davis established Cune Press in May 1994 in his native Seattle. Reportedly, Davis took his cue from Andre Schiffrin, the legendary New York editor and intellectual who ultimately left Pantheon to establish the New Press.

Davis financed Cune Press from the income of his private construction company. He was soon joined by founding "partners" Mamoun Sakkal (who was born in Aleppo) and Steven Schlesser as well as dozens of other volunteers. Sakkal was a well-known Arabic calligrapher in the Kufic style, and Schlesser was an independent historian.

The name Cune was derived from "cuneiform" a term that in Latin, means "wedge" (the shape of a stylus point in soft clay tablets). Cuneiform script was used by early Syrians—Phoenicians on the coast who developed the phonetic alphabet in their settlements near the current day city of Latakia.

Editorial Focus
Cune's website says that the publishing house is interested in Syria-related material and "thoughtful" non-fiction books including titles demonstrating political and cultural courage among women. Cune authors include Ali Farzat, a prominent political cartoonist; Ramzy Baroud, a Palestinian-American scholar who writes on the Arab-Israeli conflict and runs PalestineChronicle.com; and Sami Moubayed, a Syrian historian and author of "Steel & Silk: Men and Women Who Shaped Syria." In 2003, Davis himself published an account of what he had seen in 1987 in Syria: "The Road From Damascus" which was based on 400 pages of hand-written notes jotted down during his journey. Davis is now developing a sequel called "Light in the Palace."

Staff
Cune Press is located in Seattle. It has a four-person  back office staff who work remotely from different locations in the world. Cune's editors serve pro bono on individual projects that they feel deserve to find a public audience.

References

Book publishing companies based in Seattle
Publishing companies established in 1994
Publishing companies of the United States
1994 establishments in Washington (state)